The Whitney South Sea Expedition (1920 - 1941) to collect bird specimens for the American Museum of Natural History (AMNH), under the initial leadership of Rollo Beck, was instigated by Dr Leonard C. Sanford and financed by Harry Payne Whitney, a thoroughbred horse-breeder and philanthropist.

Beck, an expert bird collector himself, hired Ernest H. Quayle and Charles Curtis to assist with collecting, including the botanical specimens collected by the expedition.

The expedition visited islands in the south Pacific region and eventually returned with over 40,000 bird specimens, many plant specimens and an extensive collection of anthropological items and photographs.

Using the 75-ton schooner France, with many different scientists and collectors participating over more than a dozen years, the expedition visited thousands of islands throughout Oceania, Micronesia, Polynesia and Melanesia. The expedition collected many specimens from Bougainville Island. It was administered by a committee at the AMNH and became a focus for attracting funds for research on the biota of the Pacific islands.

The expedition was led by Rollo H. Beck (1920-1928), Hannibal Hamlin (1928-1930), William F. Coultas (1930-1935), Lindsay Macmillan (1935-1940), and G. Reid Henry (1941).

Ernst Mayr joined the expedition when Hamlin replaced Beck as leader on one of the later stages of the expedition, to New Guinea and the Solomon Islands in 1929–1930. Mayr was hired by the AMNH to curate the Rothschild collection in 1933, and he continued to work up the material that returned to the AMNH from the Whitney expeditions. He continued at AMNH until 1953 as curator of birds.

References

Bibliography
 Chapman, Frank M. (1935). The Whitney South Sea Expedition. Science 81: 95–97.
 Murphy, R.C. (1922). Science 56: 701–704.

External links
 The Pacific Voyages of Rollo Beck
 Whitney South Seas Expedition

1920 in the United States
1921 in the United States
1922 in the United States
1920 in science
1921 in science
1922 in science
Pacific expeditions
New Guinea expeditions
Expeditions from the United States
Scientific expeditions